Astygisa circularia is a moth of the family Geometridae first described by Charles Swinhoe in 1902. It is found in Sumatra, Java, Sulawesi and Borneo.

External links

Caberini
Moths of Asia
Moths described in 1902